John Cropley may refer to:

Sir John Cropley, 1st Baronet (d. 1676), of the Cropley baronets
Sir John Cropley, 2nd Baronet (1663–1713), MP for Shaftesbury

See also
Cropley (disambiguation)